The Borrowers Aloft is a children's fantasy novel by Mary Norton, published in 1961 by Dent in the UK and Harcourt in the US. It was the fourth of five books in a series that is usually called The Borrowers, inaugurated by The Borrowers in 1952.

Plot

With the help of their friend Spiller, the Clock family have relocated to the miniature village of Little Fordham, where everything is perfectly scaled to Borrower size. However, they are soon discovered by Miss Menzies, a kind but eccentric human woman, who reveals their existence to the village's creator, Mr Pott.  Miss Menzies and Mr Pott agree between themselves to keep the Borrowers a secret, while they also prepare a special, functioning miniature cottage for them.

Meanwhile, the Platters, a married couple who own a rival model village, learn of the Borrowers' existence.  Fearing their own model village will be ruined, as they cannot compete with a model village with live occupants, the Platters kidnap the Clock family and keep them in an attic, planning to show them after building a see-through, escape-proof miniature house in which to display the tiny family.  The Clocks are horrified at their fate, but escape seems impossible.

Imprisoned through the winter, Arrietty amuses herself by reading old newspapers.  After Arrietty discovers a series of articles on hot-air balloons, she and her father race against time to build a functional Borrower-size balloon before they are trapped forever.  With their balloon, the family escapes the attic, but, realizing they cannot return to Little Fordham, they again strike out in search of a new, safe home.

Characters

Borrowers
 Arrietty Clock
 Pod Clock
 Homily Clock

Big People, or human beans
 Mr Pott
 Miss Menzies
 Mr Platter
 Mrs Platter

Adaptations

The Return of the Borrowers: The 1993 sequel to The Borrowers, this BBC TV series starred Ian Holm, Penelope Wilton and Rebecca Callard. The series was adapted from the third and fourth books of the Borrowers series, The Borrowers Aloft and its predecessor The Borrowers Afloat. In this adaptation Mr and Mrs Platter come across the Clock Family after Mrs Driver, (who was visiting the village and overheard a conversation between the Platters) informs them of their existence, and discover them by chance after seeing smoke come out of one of the model houses.

References 

The Borrowers
Children's fantasy novels
British children's novels
English fantasy novels
J. M. Dent books
Low fantasy novels
Novels set in England
1961 fantasy novels
1961 British novels
1961 children's books
British novels adapted into television shows